L22 may refer to:

Ships 
 , a submarine of the Royal Navy
 , a destroyer of the Royal Navy
 , a sloop of the Royal Navy
 , an amphibious warfare vessel of the Indian Navy

Other uses 
 60S ribosomal protein L22
 L22 carbine, a British carbine assault rifle
 Mitochondrial ribosomal protein L22
 Yucca Valley Airport, in San Bernardino County, California, United States
 Zeppelin LZ 64, an airship of the Imperial German Navy